St. Josephs Industrial School, Artane was an Industrial School run by the Christian Brothers in Artane, Dublin from 1870 to 1969.

History
On 28 July 1870, the Artane Industrial School for Roman Catholic Boys, also known as St Joseph's, was officially certified to receive boys up to the age of 14 committed by magistrates for matters such as destitution, neglect, truancy and minor offences. The school was opened at the former site of Artane Castle on fifty six acres of land. Dormitories accommodated up to 150 boys. The dining area or refectory accommodated all 825 boys at one sitting. The facility comprised the School, the trade shops and the farm, in addition to the Community house.

Artane reached its peak enrollment of 830 in 1948, when numbers began to decline. Courts sent boys to Artane for reasons of inadequate parental care, destitution, neglect, truancy or the commission of minor offences. Adoption, fostering and boarding-out led to a decline in the number of children who would otherwise have entered the industrial schools. Artane was the largest industrial school, making it the most affected by these developments.

Cussen Commission
In 1936 the Cussen Commission inquiry into reformatories and industrial schools concluded that the school was too large and recommended that it be split into four schools. There is no indication of any follow-up on this recommendation by either the Congregation or the Department of Education. The commission was also critical of the level of education provided and the adequacy of aftercare for boys after they left school.

The Brothers had originally planned to close St. Joseph's on 31 August 1968, but action was deferred twice in order to give the Department of Education time to arrange alternative accommodation for the boys. The Institution closed on 30 June 1969. The main building is now used by St. David's CBS, while the School's refectory houses the Artane band.

Band

The school formed the Artane Boys Band in 1872, which first played in public in 1874. It became associated with the Gaelic Athletic Association and played before big matches in Croke Park. After the industrial school's closure the band continued under a community-run Artane School of Music. In 2004, after girls were admitted, the band's name was changed to the "Artane Band".

Child abuse
The Commission to Inquire into Child Abuse found that Artane was under-staffed by a small number of largely inexperienced and untrained Brothers. As a result of complaints, the Commission to Inquire into Child Abuse investigated allegations of physical abuse, child sexual abuse, and neglect at Artane. The school "used frequent and severe corporal punishment", which was "systemic and pervasive", and that even when a child behaved it was still possible for him to be beaten. Sexual abuse of children by members of the Christian Brothers was "a chronic problem", that was at least one Brother during a 33-year period was a sexual abuser, that there were at least two such abusers for more than one third of those years and that for one year in the 1940s there were at least seven such abusers. Abuse by Christian Brothers was treated as a threat to the reputation of the order, inadvertently protecting abusers. The most common reaction to abuse being reported was to move the offender to another institution run by the same order. Frequently abuse was not investigated nor was it reported to the Garda Síochána nor to the Department of Education. Exploitation of smaller pupils at the school by older ones was also significant. Mealtimes were poorly supervised, leading to smaller pupils being bullied and the facilities for serving food were primitive. Clothing was poor quality, institutional and patched, despite criticism by the Departmental Inspector and there being a surplus in school accounts. Toilet facilities were primitive before 1953 and accommodation was poor.

Notable alumni
 Brian Behan - writer

References

Sources

See also
 Industrial school
 St Joseph's Industrial School, Ferryhouse Clonmel, Co. Tipperary.
 St Joseph's Industrial School, Letterfrack, Co. Galway.
 Magdalen Asylum

Artane, Dublin
Youth detention centers
Boys' schools in the Republic of Ireland
Education in Dublin (city)
History of County Dublin
Industrial schools in the Republic of Ireland
Defunct schools in the Republic of Ireland
Educational institutions disestablished in 1969
Catholic Church sexual abuse scandals in Ireland
1969 disestablishments in Ireland
1870 establishments in Ireland
Educational institutions established in 1870
Violence against men in Europe